Raw is a 2006 live album by alternative metal band Ra. Songs are taken from their former albums From One, and Duality. "Don't Turn Away" is a newly recorded track and is also included in their 2008 album Black Sun.

Vocalist Sahaj Ticotin broke the record for the longest single note for a male vocalist in a song, having held a high B for 24 seconds during "Skorn". Sahaj overtook the previous record of 20.2 seconds which was held by Morten Harket in his song "Summer Moved On". Ra released an e-card on September 12, 2006, where the song "Don't Turn Away" could be streamed. The entire album of Raw can be downloaded for free on Ra's website.

Track listing

Credits
Ben Carroll—guitar
P.J. Farley—bass
Andy Ryan—drums
Sahaj Ticotin—vocals, guitar, engineer & mixing (12)
Stephen Pellitier—engineer
Jason Cosaro—engineer (12)
Andy Johns—mixing
Krystal Bakkila and the fans—photo credits
Chris Kabisch—art direction and design

References

External links
Free Raw download
Raw e-card

Ra (American band) albums
2006 live albums